American singer-songwriter Bridgit Mendler has embarked on two concert tours, one of which have been worldwide. Her debut tour, Bridgit Mendler: Live in Concert, started on August 25, 2012. Mendler played at state fairs and music festivals in the United States and Canada to promote her debut album Hello My Name Is... with the new songs. "Rocks at My Window" and "Hold On for Dear Love" were the only songs from the album not to be performed. She performing two covers songs in the shows, "Animal", originally by Neon Trees, and "This Love, by Maroon 5. She also sang a song from the soundtrack of Lemonade Mouth, "Somebody". On January 19, 2013 Mendler in New York from UNICEF charity. Her second concert, the Summer Tour, visited North America in the leg one and started in Iowa and ended in Washington. In 2014 Mendler announced the second leg of the tour as part of the release of her upcoming second album. The leg started in Charlottetown, Canada, on June 28, 2014.

Concert tours

Charity concerts

Notable live performances

References

Mendler, Bridgit